Mount Kaguyak is a stratovolcano located in the northeastern part of the Katmai National Park and Preserve in the U.S. state of Alaska. The surface of the crater lake lies about 550 m below the rim of the caldera. Postcaldera lava domes form a prominent peninsula in the center of the lake.

Based on radiocarbon dating the caldera-forming eruption occurred about 5800 years before present. During this eruption at least  were covered in a dacitic ignimbrite.

References 

Stratovolcanoes of the United States
Volcanoes of Kodiak Island Borough, Alaska
Mountains of Kodiak Island Borough, Alaska
Mountains of Alaska
Volcanoes of Alaska
VEI-5 volcanoes
Calderas of Alaska
Volcanic crater lakes
Aleutian Range
Holocene calderas